Chip Conquest is an American politician who served in the Vermont House of Representatives from 2008 to 2021.

References

Living people
University of Vermont alumni
21st-century American politicians
Democratic Party members of the Vermont House of Representatives
Politicians from Cleveland
Year of birth missing (living people)